Crudo or variation, may refer to:

Food
 Crudo, Italian raw fish
 Cruda, Italian tartare
 Crudos, Chilean tartare
 prosciutto crudo aka crudo, Italian ham

People
 Javier Gallego (born 1975) nicknamed "Crudo"; Spanish journalist

Surnamed
 Frank Crudo, Canadian politician
 Richard Crudo, U.S. filmmaker
 Tony Crudo (born 1959) U.S. soccer player

Music
 Crudo (band), U.S. band
 Los Crudos (band) U.S. punk band

See also

 Cotto (disambiguation)
 Tartare